The 1995 NCAA Division I Field Hockey Championship was the 15th women's collegiate field hockey tournament organized by the National Collegiate Athletic Association, to determine the top college field hockey team in the United States. The North Carolina Tar Heels won their first championship, defeating the Maryland Terrapins in the final The championship rounds were held at Kentner Stadium in Winston-Salem, North Carolina on the campus of Wake Forest University.

Bracket

References 

1995
Field Hockey
1995 in women's field hockey
1995 in sports in North Carolina
Women's sports in North Carolina